Strombina is a genus of sea snails, marine gastropod mollusks in the family Columbellidae, the dove snails.

Species
The following species are included in the genus Strombina 
 Strombina angularis Sowerby, 1832 - West America
 † Strombina arayana J. Gibson-Smith, 1974 
 Strombina bonita A. M. Strong & J. G. Hertlein, 1937 - West America
 Strombina carmencita Lowe, 1935 - West America
 Strombina colpoica W. H. Dall, 1916 - West America
 Strombina descendens (Martens, 1904)
 Strombina francesae Gibson-Smith & Gibson-Smith - Venezuela
 Strombina fusinoidea W. H. Dall, 1916 - West America
 Strombina lanceolata Sowerby, 1832 - West America
 Strombina lilacina W. H. Dall, 1916 - West America
 Strombina maculosa Sowerby, 1832 - West America
 Strombina marksi J. G. Hertlein & A. M. Strong, 1951 - West America
 Strombina paenoblita Jung, 1989
 Strombina pavonina R. B. Hinds, 1844 West America
 Strombina pulcherrima Sowerby, 1832 - West America
 Strombina pumilio L. A. Reeve, 1859 - America
 Strombina pungens A. A. Gould, 1859 - Indo-Pacific
 Strombina recurva Sowerby, 1832 - West America
 Strombina solidula L. A. Reeve, 1849 - West America

Species brought into synonymy 
 Strombina argentea Houbrick - Dominica : synonym of Cotonopsis argentea (Houbrick, 1983)
 Strombina blignautae (Kilburn, 1998): synonym of Suturoglypta blignautae (Kilburn, 1998)
 Strombina caboblanquensis Weisbord, 1962-  Caribbean : synonym of Strombina pumilio (Reeve, 1859)
 Strombina clavulus G.B. Sowerby I, 1834 - West America: synonym of Clavistrombina clavulus (G. B. Sowerby I, 1834)
 Strombina crassiparva Jung, 1989 - Galápagos Islands: synonym of Cotonopsis crassiparva P. Jung, 1989
 Strombina deroyae W. K. Emerson & A. d'Attilio, 1969 - West America : synonym of Cotonopsis deroyae (Emerson & d'Attilio, 1969)
 Strombina dorsata G.B. Sowerby I, 1832 - West America: synonym of Sincola dorsata (G. B. Sowerby I, 1832)
 Strombina edentula W. H. Dall, 1908 - West America : synonym of Cotonopsis edentula (Dall, 1908)
 Strombina elegans Sowerby, 1832 - West America : synonym of Cotonopsis turrita (G.B. Sowerby, 1832)
 Strombina galba Weisbord, 1962 - Caribbean: synonym of Mazatlania cosentini Philippi, 1836
 Strombina gibberula G.B. Sowerby I, 1832 - West America: synonym of Sincola gibberula (G. B. Sowerby I, 1832)
 Strombina hirundo Gaskoin, 1852 - North Pacific: synonym of Cotonopsis hirundo (Gaskoin, 1852)
 Strombina laevistriata Li, 1930 † : synonym of Cosmioconcha modesta (Powys, 1835)
 Strombina lindae Petuch, 1989 accepted as Cotonopsis lindae (Petuch, 1989)
 Strombina mendozana Shasky, 1970 - West America : synonym of Cotonopsis mendozana (Shasky, 1970)
 Strombina monfilsi Emerson, 1993 : synonym of  Cotonopsis monfilsi (Emerson, 1993)
 Strombina paceana W. H. Dall, 1916 - West America : synonym of Strombina maculosa (G.B. Sowerby, 1832)
 Strombina panacostaricensis Olsson, 1942 : synonym of  Cotonopsis panacostaricensis (Olsson, 1942)
 Strombina phuketensis Kosuge, Roussy & Muangman, 1998 : synonym of Cotonopsis phuketensis (Kosuge, Roussy & Muangman, 1998)
 Strombina sinuata G.B. Sowerby III, 1875 - West America: synonym of Sincola sinuata (G. B. Sowerby III, 1875)
 Strombina terquemi Jousseaume, 1876 : synonym of  Strombina pumilio (Reeve, 1859)
 Strombina turrita G.B. Sowerby I, 1832 - West America: synonym of Cotonopsis turrita (G. B. Sowerby I, 1832)

References

 Jung, P. (1986). Neogene paleontology in the northern Dominican Republic. 2. The genus Strombina (Gastropoda: Columbellidae). Bulletins of American Paleontology. 90(234): 1-42

External links
 Mörch, O. A. L. (1852-1853). Catalogus conchyliorum quae reliquit D. Alphonso d'Aguirra & Gadea Comes de Yoldi, Regis Daniae Cubiculariorum Princeps, Ordinis Dannebrogici in Prima Classe & Ordinis Caroli Tertii Eques. Fasc. 1, Cephalophora, 170 pp. [1852; Fasc. 2, Acephala, Annulata, Cirripedia, Echinodermata, 74 [+2] pp. (1853). Hafniae]
 Cossmann, M. (1901). Essais de paléoconchologie comparée. Quatrième livraison. Paris, The author and Société d'Éditions Scientifiques. 293 pp., 10 pls.
 Jung, P. (1986). Neogene paleontology in the northern Dominican Republic. 2. The genus Strombina (Gastropoda: Columbellidae). Bulletins of American Paleontology. 90(234): 1-42

Columbellidae